The Hellenic Naval Cadets Academy (abbr. ΣΝΔ, lit. "School of Naval Cadets") is a military university  and has the responsibility to educate and suitably train competent Naval Officers for the Hellenic Navy. Founded in 1845, the academy is one of the oldest educational institutions in Greece.

The academy educates Deck and Engineering Naval cadets. It may also educate Supply Officer cadets as well as Coast Guard Officer cadets. Foreign nationals are also accepted to study as naval cadets in the academy.

History
The academy has a long history in naval education. Its presence is closely associated with the foundation and evolution of the Hellenic Navy, covering a period of 150 years of educational work. The Academy was founded in 1845 as a naval training school on board the corvette . For 50 years, it operated unofficially on board various combat ships, stabilizing its position and improving its work.

In 1884, with the help of a French naval mission, the academy was officially reorganized by the Greek State and new facilities were built to house its operations. At the time, the academy's quarters were on board the corvette Hellas.

In 1905 it was transferred to Piraeus, where it has remained ever since. The academy's base was transferred to a new and permanent installation beside the harbour of Piraeus, by the entrance of the main port. The operating conditions were greatly improved by the new quarters and this better facilitated its operation. New cadets were accepted and new Navy ships were appointed to help in the educational process.

Since then, during its 150 years of operation, the Hellenic Naval Cadets Academy has evolved into one of the most prestigious institutions in Greece. More than 5,000 naval officers have graduated and led the Hellenic Navy, while many others have distinguished themselves in science, technology and politics. The organization and structure of the academy has made great reforms, always according to the needs of the Hellenic Navy.

Structure

The Academy's organization is divided into two main branches. The first branch deals with education and training and includes four Directorates: The Naval Cadet Administration, the Nautical and Military training, the Athletics and the Academic Studies directorate. The second branch is responsible of base support and everything that needs to be done for the academy's proper function.

The academy is commanded by an officer of the higher naval ranks. Issues involving academic studies are examined by the Superior Educational Council, a body formed of academy professors and naval officers under the chairmanship of the Academy Superintendent.

Admissions
The screening procedure for the selection of new cadets is based on the established system of national examinations, undertaken by all university candidates in Greece. The Hellenic Naval Academy runs additional health, intelligence and athletic tests on its candidates. About 400 cadets study in the Academy each year. All lessons are taught in Greek and basic training lasts for 4 years.

Greek nationals are admitted to the Hellenic Naval Academy following both: successful participation to the preliminary examination that includes gymnastics, physical and psychological tests and, successful participation to the annual national examinations, operated by the Ministry of Education. The number of admissions is decided by the Ministry of Defence, which issues an annual call for applications and always according to the Navy needs.

Foreign nationals are selected primarily by their governments, following bilateral agreements with the Greek state. Candidates must provide confirmation, issued by their government, that they have been selected for the particular military academy and must hold a birth certificate, a health certificate and a certificate of education equivalent to the Greek Secondary Education Certificate, required for admission to any Highest Educational Institution (University) in Greece.

Upon arrival, the foreign students attend one-year preparatory courses.  The beginners level teaching is conducted in Arabic, English and French. During that year, students take Greek language courses, mathematics, physics and chemistry fundamental courses and undergo military training. After the preparatory year, the foreign cadets join the full academic and military 4-year course, following the same program and obligations as their Greek colleagues. The costs of education are covered by scholarships and include accommodation, tuition, training and clothing expenses, but not travel costs, to and from Greece.

Education

The Hellenic Naval Cadets Academy offers a 4-year course. Aim of the education offered is to provide graduates (both deck officers and engineers) with adequate skills and knowledge to perform their duties as Navy Officers and keep up with evolving developments in naval science, strategy and technology of naval warfare.

The day at the academy begins at 6.00 am. For five days every week the cadets attend an intense training program (academic, athletic and marine) while the afternoon is available for the rest of the academy activities as well as various cultural, athletic and social events. The academic year is divided in two semesters.

During the winter term, cadets attend academic courses, professional military courses and naval training courses (off board). In addition, they receive practical courses by participating in short training voyages on various naval ships. During the Summer term, cadets of the first three classes embark for a two-month training cruise, until recently on board the training ship HN Aris and for the past few years usually on board a Frigate and a General Support Ship. The trip includes approaching at ports of various countries. Conditions for cadets to familiarize themselves with the profession and duties of an officer, are provided through instractions on professional matters, on board training and application of the theory taught, together with drills carried out during the cruise.

Graduation
Cadets graduate from the academy provided they have concluded successfully all years and courses (academic and practical). Upon their graduation, all naval officers are commissioned to combat units of the Hellenic Navy fleet. During the graduation ceremony the flag of the Hellenic Naval Academy, following tradition, is handed over by new Navy Officers to the 3rd year cadets.

In the beginning of their career, officers serve in battle-ships and attend certain specialized schools. These schools have as goal to enhance their expertise and make them familiar with the battle-ship operations and function during peace and war.

More specifically, officers are trained along the following lines:

Immediately after they graduate, officers attend a four to six-month school where they receive additional theoretical and practical training and learn about system and equipment of their appointed battle-ships, as well as their duties as officers on those ships. During the first stages of their career, officers may also choose to serve in submarines, helicopters, marine patrol aircraft and underwater demolition (Special Forces), after being trained in their respective training schools.

Furthermore, when promoted to Lieutenant Junior Grade, they go through a training stage lasting nine to eleven months. There they follow training held by various specialization departments of the Navy. According to the department they choose (or are appointed according to Navy needs), they take a degree of specialization to one of the following subjects: gunnery, navigation, communications and electronic engineering.

Lieutenant officers attend the Navy Staff Officers School and the Naval War School for 3 to 4 months on each school, where they obtain a Staff Officer degree. An officer may then serve as staff officer in various departments of the Hellenic Navy.

Finally, officers ranked Lieutenant Junior Grade and Lieutenant, may be educated abroad (in Europe or in the United States) in schools such as NPS, MIT, the University of Michigan etc., thus  becoming further specialized in fields such as electronics, weapon systems, computers, operation research, marine architecture etc.

External links
 Academy Homepage

Educational institutions established in 1845
Naval units and formations of Greece
Naval academies
Commander's Crosses of the Cross of Valour (Greece)
1845 establishments in Greece
Higher education in Greece